Tinder is combustible material used to start fires.

Tinder may also refer to:

 Tinder (app), matchmaking software
 Tinder Foundation, a UK-based charity for digital inclusion
 Tinder Press, an imprint of Headline Publishing Group
 John Daniel Tinder (born 1950), U.S. judge

See also
 Tindr (disambiguation)